San Miguel County is a county in the U.S. state of New Mexico. As of the 2010 census, the population was 29,393. Its county seat is Las Vegas.

San Miguel County comprises the Las Vegas Micropolitan Statistical Area, which is also included in the Albuquerque–Santa Fe–Las Vegas combined statistical area.

Geography

Adjacent counties
 Mora County - north
 Harding County - east
 Quay County - southeast
 Guadalupe County - south
 Torrance County - southwest
 Santa Fe County - west

National protected areas
 Las Vegas National Wildlife Refuge
 Pecos National Historical Park (part)
 Santa Fe National Forest (part)

Demographics

2000 census
As of the 2000 census, there were 30,126 people, 11,134 households, and 7,537 families living in the county. The population density was 6 people per square mile (2/km2). There were 14,254 housing units at an average density of 3 per square mile (1/km2). The racial makeup of the county was 56.22% White, 0.78% Black or African American, 1.82% Native American, 0.54% Asian, 0.08% Pacific Islander, 36.21% from other races, and 4.33% from two or more races. 77.96% of the population were Hispanic or Latino of any race.

There were 11,134 households, out of which 34.60% had children under the age of 18 living with them, 44.50% were married couples living together, 16.40% had a female householder with no husband present, and 32.30% were non-families. 26.60% of all households were made up of individuals, and 8.20% had someone living alone who was 65 years of age or older. The average household size was 2.58 and the average family size was 3.10.

In the county, the population was spread out, with 27.40% under the age of 18, 10.90% from 18 to 24, 27.00% from 25 to 44, 22.90% from 45 to 64, and 11.70% who were 65 years of age or older. The median age was 35 years. For every 100 females there were 96.70 males. For every 100 females age 18 and over, there were 93.90 males.

The median income for a household in the county was $26,524, and the median income for a family was $31,250. Males had a median income of $27,307 versus $22,588 for females. The per capita income for the county was $13,268. About 19.90% of families and 24.40% of the population were below the poverty line, including 27.80% of those under age 18 and 25.90% of those age 65 or over.

2010 census
As of the 2010 census, there were 29,393 people, 11,978 households, and 7,275 families living in the county. The racial makeup of the county was 66.6% white, 1.7% American Indian, 1.4% black or African American, 0.8% Asian, 0.1% Pacific islander, 25.4% from other races, and 3.9% from two or more races. Those of Hispanic or Latino origin made up 76.8% of the population. In terms of ancestry, 6.3% were German, 5.3% were English, and 1.6% were American.

Of the 11,978 households, 28.8% had children under the age of 18 living with them, 38.6% were married couples living together, 14.9% had a female householder with no husband present, 39.3% were non-families, and 32.5% of all households were made up of individuals. The average household size was 2.34 and the average family size was 2.95. The median age was 40.7 years.

The median income for a household in the county was $32,213 and the median income for a family was $42,888. Males had a median income of $35,176 versus $28,351 for females. The per capita income for the county was $18,508. About 15.7% of families and 24.8% of the population were below the poverty line, including 29.6% of those under age 18 and 22.7% of those age 65 or over.

Communities

City
 Las Vegas (county seat)

Villages
 El Cerrito
 Mosquero (part)
 Pecos

Census-designated places

 Conchas Dam
 East Pecos
 North San Ysidro
 Pueblo
 Ribera
 Rowe
 San Jose
 Sena
 Soham
 Tecolote
 Tecolotito
 Villanueva

Other communities

 Bernal
 El Porvenir
 Garita
 Holy Ghost
 Ilfeld
 Montezuma
 Rociada
 San Miguel del Vado
 Sapello
 Serafina
 South San Ysidro
 Tererro
 Trementina
 Valles de San Geronimo

Ghost town
 Las Ruedas

Education
School districts include:
 Las Vegas City Public Schools
 Pecos Independent Schools
 Santa Rosa Consolidated Schools
 West Las Vegas Public Schools

Native American Preparatory School, a private school, was in operation in the county until 2002.

Notable people
 Antonia Apodaca (1923–2020) born in Rociada, folk musician and composer
 Margaret Larkin (1899–1967), born in Las Vegas, writer and musician
 María Dolores Gonzáles (1917-1975), leader in bilingual education in New Mexico

Politics
San Miguel County is heavily Democratic. The last time it voted Republican for president was 1956, and since 1992 no Republican has cracked 30% of the vote.

See also
 National Register of Historic Places listings in San Miguel County, New Mexico
 San Miguel del Vado Land Grant

References

External links

 

 
1852 establishments in New Mexico Territory
Populated places established in 1852
Hispanic and Latino American culture in New Mexico